Wesley Methodist Cathedral is the name of several cathedrals of the Methodist Church Ghana:

 Wesley Methodist Cathedral (Accra)
 Wesley Methodist Cathedral (Cape Coast)
 Wesley Methodist Cathedral (Kumasi)
 Wesley Methodist Cathedral (Sekondi)